The San Luis Obispo County Fire Department provides fire protection and emergency response services for the unincorporated areas of San Luis Obispo County, California as well as the communities of Los Osos, Pismo Beach and Avila Beach. CAL FIRE a California state agency, functions as the fire department for San Luis Obispo under a contract with the county, and has done so since 1930. The department has 180 full-time employees in the Department. These full-time employees are supplemented by up to 100 seasonal firefighters, 300 paid-call and reserve firefighters, and 120 state inmate firefighters.

Stations

See also

San Luis Obispo County
CAL FIRE

References

County government agencies in California
Government of San Luis Obispo County, California
Fire departments in California